Irina Pavlovna Grishkova (born 18 September 1946) is a former ice dancer who represented the Soviet Union. With Viktor Ryzhkin, she is the 1967 Prague Skate champion, a two-time Prize of Moscow News champion, and a two-time Soviet national champion. The duo finished in the top ten at four ISU Championships. Earlier in her career, she competed in partnership with Alexander Treshchev.

Competitive highlights

With Ryzhkin

With Treshchev

References 

1946 births
Russian female ice dancers
Soviet female ice dancers
Living people
Figure skaters from Moscow